Euprymna hyllebergi is a species of bobtail squid native to the eastern Indian Ocean, specifically the Andaman Sea off Thailand. It is known from depths to 74 m.

E. hyllebergi grows to 35 mm in mantle length.

The type specimen was collected in the Andaman Sea off Kantang Fish Landing in Trang Province, Thailand. It is deposited at the Phuket Marine Biological Center in Phuket.

References

External links

Bobtail squid
Molluscs described in 1997